47 morto che parla is a 1950 Italian comedy film directed by Carlo Ludovico Bragaglia. The film stars Totò and Silvana Pampanini.

Plot

The story is set in a small town near Naples in early 1900. Baron Antonio Peletti is a stingy and cruel man who thinks only of spending the bare minimum needed for his son and future daughter-in-law, even though he lives in a luxurious house. The servant Contrado is forced to go hungry because of the miser. In fact, every time Antonio has to spend even a penny to buy something, he complains of unnecessary waste, exclaiming: "And I pay, and I pay!!" But one day his son wants to steal a box full of gold coins that Antonio hid under the bed, as a way of revenge. But in order to steal the gold, the son needs the complicity of all higher institutions in the city, including the mayor, one of the most bitter enemies of Antonio. The mayor wants to build a primary school for the children of the village, but the cruel Antonio prevents the funding because he does not want to throw out a penny! So the pharmacist gives Antonio a sleeping pill and deceives him into believing that he drank poison accidentally. Antonio wakes and believes he is in Hell, where he sees the really desolate condition of the villagers. Then the Baron meets a soul who persuades him to donate money to the mayor's box to set up the school. Only then will Antonio be redeemed from his sins in the past and go to Purgatory. However, during this operation something goes wrong and Antonio realizes the trap of the villagers. The son, in order not to lose money, steals the box of gold and runs away in a balloon with his girlfriend, but Antonio catches up to him and the three hover in the air. But due to a failure of the balloon, they start to descend towards the sea and so must lighten it; Antonio is forced into tears and falls overboard with his heavy box full of gold coins. He is thought to have sunk somewhere near Sardinia, but at the end of the story, the Baron, coming back from the island on a donkey on the very day of inauguration, eventually understands his mistakes and decides to finance the project of founding the school.

Cast
 Totò as Il barone Antonio Peletti 
 Silvana Pampanini as Madame Bonbon, la canzonettista
 Carlo Croccolo as Gontrano
 Adriana Benetti as Rosetta 
 Dante Maggio as Dante Cartoni, il partner della canzonettista 
 Tina Lattanzi as La moglie dei sindaco 
 Aldo Bufi Landi as Gastone 
 Eduardo Passarelli as  Il farmacista 
 Arturo Bragaglia as Il sindaco 
 Mario Castellani as Il colonnello Bertrand de Tassigny 
 Gildo Bocci as Il macellaio 
  as Il dottore
Gigi Reder as Spa's Usher

External links 

 

1950 films
1950s Italian-language films
Italian black-and-white films
1950 comedy films
Films directed by Carlo Ludovico Bragaglia
Films set in Campania
Films with screenplays by Age & Scarpelli
Italian comedy films
1950s Italian films